Civil Aviation and Airpots Authority of Somaliland (CAAA) functions as the regulatory body for all aviation related activities in Somaliland.  the current Manager is Abdi Mohamed Rodol.

See also

Ministry of Civil Aviation (Somaliland)
Berbera Airport
Egal International Airport

References

2017 establishments in Somaliland
Air navigation service providers
Government agencies established in 2017
Government agencies of Somaliland